"Speakers Going Hammer" is the third official single from the album, The DeAndre Way, by American rapper Soulja Boy. The song features production by Boi-1da. The song was released to iTunes on October 19, 2010. The song peaked at number 48 on the Billboard Hot R&B & Hip-Hop Songs chart. Artists including T-Pain, Pusha T and Royce da 5'9" have remixed the track.

Background
The track showcases Soulja Boy's style as he raps about how loud his audio pumps. It finds the rapper exhibiting the same pop sensibility fans have come to know. Soulja Boy stated Interscope executive Jimmy Iovine and rapper Kanye West really liked the track which drove him to release it as a single.

Production
The track was described by Rap-Up as having a "burping bass line and horn-peppered instrumental." DJBooth described the track as being "backed by Boi-1da string stabs and fingersnaps." Sara D. Anderson of AOL Radio stated the track is "backed by crescendoing sirens and synth-laden staccato backbeats."

Music video
The music video was released November 26, 2010 and was directed by Gil Green.

Live performances
The first performance of "Speakers Going Hammer" occurred at the Beats By Dr. Dre headphone product launch in Manhattan on October 9, 2010. The song was performed live at the 2010 BET Hip Hop Awards. Another performance happened on Lopez Tonight. He also performed the song on The Tonight Show with Jay Leno on November 11, 2010. Speakers Going Hammer was performed on The Sims 3 on the Hip Hop station.

Charts

Release history

References

2010 singles
2010 songs
Soulja Boy songs
Interscope Records singles
Song recordings produced by Boi-1da
Songs written by Soulja Boy
Songs written by Maejor